Mercy Wanjiku Njoroge (born 10 June 1986) is a Kenyan long-distance runner who specialises in the steeplechase.

She finished fourth in 3000 metres steeplechase at the 2004 World Junior Championships as well as in the junior race at the 2005 World Cross Country Championships. She claimed the steeplechase title at the 2005 African Junior Athletics Championships.

Moving into the senior ranks, at the 2006 World Cross Country Championships she finished twelfth in the long race, helping the Kenyans to the silver medal in the team competition. She was fifth in the steeplechase at both the 2007 All-Africa Games and 2008 African Championships in Athletics. Njoroge won the silver medal in the steeplechase behind Milcah Chemos Cheywa at the 2010 Commonwealth Games in New Delhi.

She opened her 2011 season with an indoor 3000 m best of 8:50.32 minutes to win at the Sparkassen Cup.

She is based at the PACE Sports Management training camp in Kaptagat.

Personal bests
3000 metres - 8:48.16 min (2006)
3000 metres steeplechase - 9:16.94 min (2011)
5000 metres - 15:17.03 min (2011)

References

External links

1986 births
Living people
Kenyan female long-distance runners
Kenyan female middle-distance runners
Kenyan female steeplechase runners
Olympic athletes of Kenya
Athletes (track and field) at the 2012 Summer Olympics
Commonwealth Games silver medallists for Kenya
Commonwealth Games medallists in athletics
Athletes (track and field) at the 2010 Commonwealth Games
World Athletics Championships athletes for Kenya
Kenyan female cross country runners
Athletes (track and field) at the 2007 All-Africa Games
African Games competitors for Kenya
21st-century Kenyan women
Medallists at the 2010 Commonwealth Games